The 2015 Liga Super is the 12th season of the Liga Super, the top-tier professional football league in Malaysia.

The season was held from 31 January and concluded in 22 August 2015.

The Liga Super champions for 2015 was Johor Darul Ta'zim.

Teams
A total of 12 teams compete in the 2015 season which includes the top 10 teams that participated in the 2014 season and champions and runners-up of the 2014 Liga Premier.

T-Team and PKNS were relegated at the end of the 2014 Liga Super season after finishing in the bottom place of the league table.

2014 Liga Premier unbeaten champions PDRM and runners-up Felda United secured direct promotion to the Liga Super.

  1 Correct as of end of 2014 Liga Super season
  2 Terengganu uses the Sultan Ismail Nasiruddin Shah Stadium until the end of April 2015 due to renovation work being done at Sultan Mizan Zainal Abidin Stadium, subject pending installation of flood light.

Stadiums and locations

Personnel and sponsoring

Note: Flags indicate national team as has been defined under FIFA eligibility rules. Players may hold more than one non-FIFA nationality.

Coaching changes

Foreign players

League table

Results

Season statistics

Top scorers

Hat-tricks

Clean sheets

Scoring

 First goal of the season: Marcos António for Johor Darul Ta'zim against Pahang (37th minutes, 21:12 UTC+8) (31 January 2015)
 Fastest goal of the season: 17 seconds (Ahmad Fakri Saarani); Kelantan 1–2 Terengganu (8 August 2015)
 Fastest hat-trick of the season: 15 minutes (Afiq Azmi); Selangor 4–0 LionsXII (18 April 2015)
 Largest winning margin: 4 goals
 Selangor 4 – 0 LionsXII (18 April 2015)
 Highest scoring game: 8 goals
 LionsXII 5–3 PDRM (7 February 2015)
 PDRM 3–5 Pahang (20 June 2015)
 Felda United 4–4 Selangor (20 June 2015)
 Pahang 5–3 Kelantan (12 August 2015/)
 Most goals scored in a match by a single team: 5 goals
 LionsXII 5–3 PDRM (7 February 2015)
 PDRM 3–5 Pahang (20 June 2015)
 Pahang 5–3 Kelantan (12 August 2015)
 Most goals scored in a match by a losing team: 3 goals
 LionsXII 5–3 PDRM (7 February 2015)

Awards

Monthly awards

The player of the month award will be given monthly. It were given by Professional Footballers Association of Malaysia (PFAM) starting May 2015. Five players will be pick each month by PFAM and will be shown on their official websites. The player will be voted in a survey and the player with the most vote will be picked as PFAM Player Of The Month.

Attendances

Crowd Attendance for all venues 

Sources: Sistem Pengurusan Maklumat Bolasepak (FAM)

By Week

See also

 2015 Liga Premier
 2015 Liga FAM
 2015 Piala FA
 2015 Piala Presiden
 2015 Piala Belia

References

External links
 Football Malaysia Official Website

Malaysia Super League seasons
1
Malaysia
Malaysia